The Berezil Theatre was an avant-garde Soviet Ukrainian theater troupe founded by Les Kurbas. It lasted from 1922 to 1933. Its original home was in Kyiv, but in 1926 the troupe moved to Kharkiv. Also known as Artistic Organization Berezil’, the company included several studios, a journal, museum, and theater school. In 1927, Kurbas and the Berezil began collaborating closely with Ukrainian playwright Mykola Kulish. After the production of Kulish's last play, Maklena Grasa, Kurbas was sent into exile by the Ministry of Education. The theater was then renamed the Taras Shevchenko Theater by the government.

Selected productions 
 Haz (Gas), 1922, written by Georg Kaiser
 Macbeth, 1924, written by William Shakespeare
 Dance of numbers, 1927, directed by Les Kurbas, set design by Vadim Meller
 Narodnyi Malakhii (The People’s Malakhii), 1927, written by Mykola Kulish
 Sonata Pathétique, written by Mykola Kulish
 Maklena Grasa, 1933, written by Mykola Kulish

References 

Theatre companies in Ukraine
1922 establishments in Ukraine